The Quad Cities metropolitan area, more formally known as the Davenport–Moline–Rock Island Metropolitan Statistical Area, is the metropolitan area associated with the Quad Cities in the U.S. states of Iowa and Illinois. The area consists of the cities of Davenport and Bettendorf in Iowa and Rock Island, Moline, and East Moline in Illinois, and their suburbs in northwest Illinois and southeast Iowa. The Quad Cities metropolitan area is also considered part of the Great Lakes Megalopolis, and is the largest metropolitan area along the Mississippi River in Iowa and between Minneapolis–Saint Paul and the St. Louis metropolitan area. 

The Davenport–Moline–Rock Island Metropolitan Statistical Area consists of four counties: Scott County in Iowa and Henry, Mercer, and Rock Island counties in Illinois. The MSA had an estimated population of 381,568 as of 2020, and the CSA had a population of 474,019, making it the 91st largest CSA in the nation.

Communities

Largest municipalities

Places with 1,000 to 10,000 inhabitants
 Silvis, Illinois
Andalusia, Illinois
 Aledo, Illinois
 Blue Grass, Iowa
 Buffalo, Iowa
 Cambridge, Illinois
 Carbon Cliff, Illinois
 Coal Valley, Illinois
 Colona, Illinois
 Eldridge, Iowa
 Geneseo, Illinois
 Hampton, Illinois
 Le Claire, Iowa
 Milan, Illinois
 Orion, Illinois
 Park View, Iowa
 Port Byron, Illinois
 Walcott, Iowa

Places with fewer than 1,000 inhabitants
 Andover, Illinois
 Annawan, Illinois
 Atkinson, Illinois
 Cleveland, Illinois
 Dixon, Iowa
 Donahue, Iowa
 Long Grove, Iowa
 Matherville, Illinois
 Maysville, Iowa
 McCausland, Iowa
 New Liberty, Iowa
 North Henderson, Illinois
 Panorama Park, Iowa
 Pleasant Valley, Iowa
 Princeton, Iowa
 Riverdale, Iowa
 Sherrard, Illinois

Unincorporated places
 Barstow, Illinois
 Creekville, Iowa
 Dayton, Illinois
 Lynn Center, Illinois
 Montpelier, Iowa
 Mount Joy, Iowa
 Nekoma, Illinois
 Osco, Illinois
 Ophiem, Illinois
Park View, Iowa
 Preemption, Illinois

References

 
Metropolitan areas of Iowa
Metropolitan areas of Illinois